Dream of an Opium Eater are an instrumental metal band, originally commissioned by Roskilde Festival in Denmark to play a one-off set in 2007. The band play music which accompanies Norwegian short horror films, which are projected onstage throughout the performance.

The band played the Odeon stage at Roskilde Festival on 7 July 2007. Although this was intended to be their only show, the band were then approached by Carling Leeds Festival, resulting in a performance on the Alternative Stage at Leeds on 23 August 2007. A third show was performed at the Wacken Open Air festival in Germany, on 1 August 2008.

Ivar Bjørnson also plays guitar for Norwegian bands Enslaved and Trinacria, Reuben Gotto played guitar for UK bands Johnny Truant and Twin Zero, Julia Ruzicka currently plays bass guitar for Tricky and was a member of the now defunct Million Dead, and Ben Calvert plays drums for Killing Joke as well as Malpractice, an Adam F fronted rock band.

Current line-up 
Reuben Gotto - guitar
Ivar Bjørnson - guitar
Julia Ruzicka - bass guitar
Ben Calvert - drums

External links
Dream of an Opium Eater on MySpace

Instrumental musical groups
British heavy metal musical groups